= South Broadway Park, Lexington =

Neighborhood in Lexington, Kentucky

Coordinates: 38.038°N 84.513°W

South Broadway Park is a neighborhood in southwestern Lexington, Kentucky, United States. Its boundaries are Bucoto Court to the north, Norfolk Southern railroad tracks to the east, South Broadway to the west, and Virginia Avenue to the south. It is located just west of the University of Kentucky.

Neighborhood statistics

- Area: 0.034 square miles (0.088 km^{2})
- Population: 167
- Population density: 4,946 people per square mile
- Median household income: $24,305
